Gary John Connolly (born 22 June 1971) is a former professional rugby league footballer who played in the 1980s, 1990s and 2000s as a  and  for St Helens, Canterbury Bulldogs, Wigan Warriors, Leeds Rhinos and for the Great Britain national side. In the twilight of his career, he played rugby union for Irish side Munster.

Playing career

St Helens
Connolly was born in St. Helens, Lancashire, England. At 17 years of age he appeared in St. Helens' ill-fated 0–27 defeat by their arch rivals Wigan at Wembley Stadium in the 1989 Challenge Cup final on the back of some impressive performances. It was the first time in Challenge Cup Final history at Wembley that a team had been held scoreless.

Gary Connolly made his international rugby league début for Great Britain against the touring Papua New Guinea team on 9 November 1991 at Central Park in Wigan. Connolly played from the bench as the Lions defeated the Kumuls 56–4.

He was later selected to go on the 1992 Great Britain Lions tour of Australia and New Zealand where he played from the bench in the final two Ashes Tests against Australia before moving to the centres for the tests against New Zealand. Later that year he was selected to play in the centres for Great Britain in their 6–10 defeat by Australia in the 1992 Rugby League World Cup Final at Wembley.

Gary Connolly played right- in St. Helens' 24-14 victory over Rochdale Hornets in the 1991 Lancashire Cup Final during the 1991–92 season at Wilderspool Stadium, Warrington, on Sunday 20 October 1991, and played right- in the 4-5 defeat by Wigan in the 1992 Lancashire Cup Final during the 1992–93 season at Knowsley Road, St. Helens, on Sunday 18 October 1992.

His move to rivals, Wigan, in 1993 was a controversial one and many St. Helens followers labelled him 'Judas'. Wigan paid £250,000 for Gary Connolly when he moved from St Helens in 1993 (based on increases in average earnings, this would be approximately £496,800 in 2013).

Wigan
Connolly was a member of the successful Wigan team of the mid-1990s. After the 1993–94 Rugby Football League season he travelled with defending champions Wigan to Brisbane for the 1994 World Club Challenge, as a fullback in their 20–14 win over Australian premiers the Brisbane Broncos at the ANZ Stadium in front of a World Club Challenge record attendance of 54,220.

Prior to his move to Wigan, Connolly played 15 games of the 1993 NSWRL season with Sydney club Canterbury-Bankstown. While with the Bulldogs, Connolly played mostly in the centres and crossed for 5 tries including 2 on debut against South Sydney. While Connolly was a star import for the Bulldogs, his worst game came when Brisbane Broncos international centre Steve Renouf scored 4 tries against him in their game at the ANZ Stadium.

Gary Connolly played left- in Wigan's 2-33 defeat by Castleford in the 1993–94 Regal Trophy Final during the 1993–94 season at Elland Road, Leeds on Saturday 22 January 1994, played left- and scored a try in the 40-10 victory over Warrington in the 1994–95 Regal Trophy Final during the 1994–95 season at Alfred McAlpine Stadium, Huddersfield on Saturday 28 January 1995, and played  in the 25-16 victory over St. Helens in the 1995–96 Regal Trophy Final during the 1994–95 season at Alfred McAlpine Stadium, Huddersfield on Saturday 13 January 1996. In May 1996, Connolly was one of a number of Wigan's players to appear in both games of the two-match cross-code challenge series against Bath.

Connolly was selected to play for the English national team in their 1995 World Cup campaign and played in the centres in the World Cup Final at Wembley, though England would go down to defending champions Australia 16–8.

Connolly played a one-off international for a 'Rest of the World' team in their 28–8 loss against the Australian Rugby League's Kangaroos in mid-1997. Connolly played for Wigan at centre in their 1998 Super League Grand Final victory against Leeds Rhinos. He was named in the 1999 season's Super League Dream Team at centre. Connolly played for the Wigan Warriors at centre in their 2001 Super League Grand Final loss against the Bradford Bulls.

Harlequins and Orrell
In late 1995, rugby union became a professional game, allowing league players the opportunity to try their hand at the 15-a-side game. In the off-season following the completion of Super League I, a number of players from Super League clubs took the opportunity to sign short-term deals with clubs in the Courage League, the top flight of rugby union in England. Connolly was one of a number of players from Wigan to sign such a deal, which he did with London club Harlequins. Connolly played 13 games for Harlequins, scoring eight tries, and was regarded as the best of the short-term converts at the time.

In 2000, Connolly signed a new deal with Wigan that included the opportunity to play union for Orrell during the off-season. Connolly remained at the club for two years until he was released by Wigan and signed for Leeds Rhinos in 2002.

Leeds
Connolly moved to Leeds in 2003 and the same year was awarded the Lance Todd Trophy as Man of the Match in the 2003 Challenge Cup Final against Bradford Bulls. He was also named in the 2003 Super League Dream Team at fullback.

Connolly was regarded as one of the premier British centres of his generation and appeared 31 times for the national side excelling in the defensive side of the game, although his try scoring record was very modest at this level.

Wigan, Widnes and Munster
In 2004, Connolly was released by Leeds, and returned for a short spell at Wigan for whom he played 17 games during the 2004 season. Released at the end of the season, although given the option of a return to rugby union with Orrell, he instead signed a one-year deal with Widnes for the 2005 season. Following the club's relegation that season, Connolly was released, and signed a short-term deal to return to rugby union with Munster.

References

External links
Gary Connolly St Helens Career Page on the Saints Heritage Society Website.
Gary Connolly Statistics at wigan.rlfans.com
(archived by web.archive.org) Canterbury Bulldogs profile
2001 Ashes profile 
Munster Profile

1971 births
Living people
Canterbury-Bankstown Bulldogs players
England national rugby league team players
English people of Irish descent
English rugby league players
English rugby union players
Great Britain national rugby league team players
Harlequin F.C. players
Ireland national rugby league team players
Lancashire rugby league team players
Lance Todd Trophy winners
Leeds Rhinos players
Munster Rugby players
Orrell R.U.F.C. players
Rugby league centres
Rugby league fullbacks
Rugby league players from St Helens, Merseyside
Rugby union centres
Rugby union players from St Helens, Merseyside
St Helens R.F.C. players
Widnes Vikings players
Wigan Warriors players